Jacksonville High School is a public high school located in Jacksonville, Alabama, USA, serving grades 7–12. It is part of the Jacksonville City Schools system. Its colors are blue and gold.

Until 1998, the school was located adjacent to the Jacksonville State University campus on Pelham Road North. The current school building was built on part of the site of the former Jacksonville Airport.

Notable alumni
Rick Bragg (class of 1977): journalist for the Jacksonville News, Anniston Star, Birmingham News, St. Petersburg Times, and New York Times; won Pulitzer Prize in 1996 for coverage of Oklahoma City bombing for the New York Times.
Lilly Ledbetter (class of 1956): plaintiff in Ledbetter v. Goodyear Tire & Rubber Co. United States Supreme Court case about pay discrimination; namesake in Lilly Ledbetter Fair Pay Act of 2009
Darrell Malone (class of 1986): American football cornerback who played for Jacksonville State from 1987 to 1990 and in the NFL from 1992 to 1994
Shed Long (class of 2012):Major League Baseball second baseman who is currently playing for the Seattle Mariners. He attended Jacksonville State University and played baseball. He was drafted by the Cincinnati Reds in 2016 but traded in 2019 to the Mariners.
Todd Cunningham (class of 2007): Major League Baseball left fielder attended Jacksonville State University and played baseball for the Gamecocks. He was drafted in 2008 by the Atlanta Braves. He then was traded to the Los Angeles Angels and made his last MLB appearance in 2016 with the Angels.
Riley Green (class of 2008), country music singer

References

High schools in Jacksonville, Alabama
Jacksonville, Alabama
Schools in Calhoun County, Alabama
Public high schools in Alabama